José Corral may refer to:

 José Manuel Corral (politician), an Argentinian politician
 José Manuel Corral (footballer), a Spanish footballer and manager
 José Andrés Corral Arredondo, a Roman Catholic bishop in Mexico